Benjamin Corgnet (born 6 April 1987) is a French professional footballer who plays as a midfielder.

Career
Corgnet had the opportunity to join the youth academy of Lyon aged 11, but his parents preferred that he concentrated on his studies. Instead he trained with Olympique Saint-Genis-Laval and from the age of 18 to 22 with US Millery Vourles. He joined fifth division side Monts d'Or Azergues in 2009, before being contacted by Dijon coach Patrice Carteron. He joined Dijon in the summer of 2010 after completing his education.

Corgnet made his professional debut with Dijon in a Coupe de la Ligue tie against Amiens on 30 July 2010. He made his league debut a week later, in the first round of Ligue 2 games against Angers. His first professional goal came on 17 September 2010, in the 5–1 Ligue 2 win over Evian.

Corgnet joined Lorient from Dijon on 4 September 2012 in a €6 million deal.

In July 2013, he joined Saint-Étienne in Ligue 1.

After four seasons with Saint-Étienne, Corgnet signed a three-year contract with Strasbourg in July 2017.

Without a club since being released by Strasbourg in the summer of 2020, Corgnet signed for Championnat National side Bourg-Péronnas in January 2021.

References

External links
 
 
 

Living people
1987 births
People from Thionville
Sportspeople from Moselle (department)
Association football midfielders
French footballers
GOAL FC players
Dijon FCO players
FC Lorient players
AS Saint-Étienne players
RC Strasbourg Alsace players
Football Bourg-en-Bresse Péronnas 01 players
Ligue 1 players
Ligue 2 players
Championnat National players
Championnat National 3 players
Footballers from Grand Est